Cirsotrema zografakisi is a species of sea snail, a marine gastropoda mollusk in the family Epitoniidae.

Original description
    Poppe G.T., Tagaro S.P. & Brown L. (2006) A new large Cirsotrema from Australia. Visaya 1(6): 35-37. [October 2006].

References

External links
 Worms Link

Epitoniidae